Tejas may refer to:

Places
 Texas
 Spanish Texas, colonial province
 Mexican Texas, territory of post-independence Mexico
 Coahuila y Tejas, a state under the 1824 Mexican constitution that included the region of present-day Texas
 Tejas, Humacao, Puerto Rico, a barrio
 Tejas, Las Piedras, Puerto Rico, a barrio
 Tejas, Yabucoa, Puerto Rico, a barrio

Other uses
 HAL Tejas, an Indian combat aircraft
 Tejas, a Native American tribe of the Hasinai confederation of North America (present day Texas)
 Tejas, roofing tiles used in late (post-1790) California mission architecture
 Tejas (album), the fifth album by the blues-rock band ZZ Top
 Tejas (film), an upcoming Bollywood film
 Tejas and Jayhawk, code names for a microprocessor developed by Intel
 Tejas Club, a student organization at the University of Texas at Austin
 Tejas Express of India
 Vernon Tejas, American mountain climber and mountain guide

See also
 Teja (disambiguation)